SJ (formally SJ AB) is a government-owned passenger train operator in Sweden. SJ was created in 2001, out of the public transport division of Statens Järnvägar, when the former government agency was divided into six separate government-owned limited companies. In 2018 SJ carried 31.8 million passengers.

Overview
SJ's operations fall broadly into subsidised and unsubsidised services. The unsubsidised services was until 2011 monopoly. The subsidised trains are awarded through competitive bids. However, some trains fall in between these categories, since public transit agencies can pay SJ to allow transit pass holders access to SJ's trains.

SJ received a government bailout a few years after its creation, but has since had profit margins of up to ten per cent. All train operators in Sweden pay low track access charges to the track authority, Trafikverket.

Rolling stock

SJ higher speed services (SJ Snabbtåg)
The trains currently serves Stockholm-Gothenburg (Västra Stambanan) and Stockholm-Malmö-Copenhagen (Södra Stambanan and Öresund Line), but have previously served the lines Stockholm-Sundsvall and, seasonally, Stockholm-Strömstad, Stockholm-Oslo and Stockholm-Östersund-(Duved) lines. There are about 40 X2 sets in service.
X55 is a newer train introduced in 2012. The interior is mainly modern style, and the train has a top speed of 200 km/h and serves Stockholm-Östersund-(Duved) (Mittbanan-Norra Stambanan)-Stockholm-Uddevalla (Västra Stambanan and Bohusbanan) to advance to Gothenburg for night parking-Stockholm-Sundsvall-Umeå (Ostkustbanan, Botniabanan), Gothenburg-Malmö (Västkustbanan), Stockholm-Karlstad (Västra Stambanan) and Stockholm-Falun/Mora (Dalabanan). Some of these lines are run under the SJ InterCity-brand despite no difference in product with other lines run by the X55 train. SJ has ordered 25 Bombardier Zefiro high speed trains for 250 km/h to be delivered in 2026.

SJ InterCity
InterCity trains are Rc-hauled trains, often with many 2nd class cars, or X55 trains. InterCity trains also have a bistro car.

SJ Regional
SJ Regional services include double-deckers (X40), pull trains, X50 and X52 cars. The trains do not serve meals or drinks. The trains do not usually travel distances over 4 hours, except Coast to Coast (Gothenburg-Kalmar) and Stockholm-Gothenburg via Västerås. Most trains have first class, except the X50 and X52 trains.  All push and pull regional services have since 2020 been replaced with new ER1 trains. A normal order in a pull train was AB7-BF7-B7 or B7-BF7-B7 or AB7-B7-BF7-B7. These trains were not usually longer than 4 cars, except Uppsalapendeln (Stockholm-Uppsala) which often has 8 cars and is a push and pull.

Services

Sleeper services - SJ Nattåg
The SJ overnight train services (Swedish: SJ Nattåg) are Rc locomotive-hauled trains with both sleeper wagons as well as standard wagons. All services except for the Stockholm-Malmö route have a bistro wagon. The night-trains are operated on the following lines:

SJ InterCity
The InterCity services are Rc-hauled trains with standard-seating carriages in both first and second class. There is always a bistro car available in the trainset.

Lines with InterCity service:

SJ Regional
Most of the SJ Regional network was concentrated in the area around lake Mälaren. Operated with either Rc-hauled trainsets, X12/X14 or X40 EMUs. These trains have no catering on board. The X40 is equipped with free 4G WiFi. Both first and second-class are usually offered. Most of this network has been incorporated into the new Mälartåg franchise, although some services remain outside of it.

Routes listed below are the satellite routes which are not subject to franchising.

Franchised operations
SJ operate a couple of regional rail franchises held by public transport authorities around the country. The most significant of these are Mälartåg and Västtågen serving the Mälaren valley and the region of West Götaland respectively. SJ AB also started operating the Öresundståg franchise for the 2020 timetable, taking over from Transdev. But due to serious inconsistencies between partners the contract will be terminated as of December 2022 where Transdev will take over again
. 
MTR will take over the Mälartåg contract in December 2021.

The stretch Malmö Central to Copenhagen Central is operated 50/50 alongside Danish State RailwaysDSB (railway company) and Copenhagen to Østerport/Nivå by DSB only.

The initial contract for the Mälartåg franchise states that the operator may use their own fleet [of X12, X40 and X50 stock] until the delivery of ER1 Stadler Dosto 200 EMUs is completed. The Upptåget franchise will be merged into Mälartåg onwards from the 2022 timetable, meaning that services from Gävle gain additional stations inherited from the termination of the Upptåget franchise.

SJ higher speed trains
SJ higher speed trains (Swedish: SJ Snabbtåg) are X2 or X55 trains operating on the main routes in Sweden. The train is equipped with WiFi and has a bistro.

Stops at Arlanda and Uppsala are for boarding northbound or alighting southbound respectively, although passengers with railcards are exempted from this rule. Some services do also allow both boarding and alighting at Arlanda and Uppsala respectively.

SJ Norge
On 7 June 2020 SJ Norge commenced operating services on the Trøndelag Commuter Rail, as well as the Meråker, Røros, Rauma, Nordland, the Saltpendel Line and the Dovre Regional Line under a 10-year contract with the Norwegian Railway Directorate.

SJ Is also set to start up Train Services on the Stockholm - Trondheim stretch as soon as the Norwegian part of the railway is electrified.

SJ will operate trains owned by Norske Tog (Norwegian Trains) and these are:

Class 76 or Stadler FLIRT Bio-Mode's (Hybrid Electric EMUs) as well as Di - 4 Diesel-Electric Locomotives, Class 92 Duewag DMUs,

EL18 Electric Locomotives, Class 93 Bombardier Talent DMUs and Class 73 ADtranz EMUs.

The Railway Stretches SJ Norge is set to operate:

 Steinkjer – Trondheim Central
 Steinkjer – Lerkendal/Trondheim Outskirts
 Steinkjer – Lundamo
 Steinkjer – Melhus
 Lerkendal/Trondheim Outskirts – Trondheim Central
 Trondheim Central – Heimdal
 Trondheim Central – Melhus
 Trondheim Central – Lundamo
 Trondheim Central – Røros
 Trondheim Central – Stjørdal/Værnes Airport
 Heimdal – Storlien (interchange with Norrtåg toward Östersund
 Trondheim Central – Bodø
 Trondheim Central – Mo i Rana
 Trondheim Central – Oslo Central
 Rotvoll – Røros
 Rotvoll – Støren
 Steinkjer – Støren
 Røros – Hamar
 Saltpendelen
 Stockholm — Trondheim

Identity document requirements
From September 2009, SJ requires an identity document from passengers with a pre-paid ticket (which is mandatory on many trains). This can be a Nordic ID card or any passport. This is due to an effort to stop private trading of train tickets.

Photogallery

See also

Statens Järnvägar (1856–2000)
Nils Ericson, railway pioneer
Transportation in Sweden
Rail transport in Sweden
List of railway companies
Green Cargo
Tågkompaniet
Veolia Transport
Banverket

References

External links

Swedish Transport Administration

Railway companies of Norway
Railway companies of Sweden
Government-owned companies of Sweden
Swedish companies established in 2001
Railway companies established in 2001
Swedish brands